General Johnston may refer to:

United Kingdom
Alexander C. Johnston (1884–1952), British Army brigadier general
James Johnston (British Army officer, born 1721) (1721–1795), British Army general
James Johnston (British Army officer, died 1797) (c. 1721–1797), British Army general
James Johnston (British Army officer, born 1911) (1911–1988), British Army major general
Maurice Robert Johnston (1929–), British Army lieutenant general
Thomas Henry Johnston (British Army officer), British Army general

United States
Albert Sidney Johnston (1803–1862), Confederate States Army general
Gary W. Johnston (fl. 2010s–2020s), U.S. Army major general
George Doherty Johnston (1837–1919), Confederate States Army brigadier general
John Alexander Johnston (1858–1940), U.S. Army brigadier general
Joseph E. Johnston (1807–1891), Confederate States Army general & United States Army brigadier general
Richard C. Johnston (fl. 1980s–2010s), U.S. Air Force Major general
Robert B. Johnston (1937–), U.S. Marine Corps Lieutenant general
Robert Daniel Johnston (1837–1919), Confederate States Army brigadier general
William Johnston Jr. (1861–1933), U.S. Army major general

Others
George Johnston (general) (1868–1949), Australian Army major general
George Napier Johnston (1867–1947), Australian Army major general
Francis Earl Johnston (1871–1917), New Zealand Army brigadier general

See also
George Johnstone (British Army officer), whose name is sometimes spelled "Johnston"
Robert Maxwell Johnstone (1914–1990), British Army major general